Job losses caused by the Great Recession refers to jobs that have been lost worldwide within people since the start of the Great Recession. In the US, job losses have been going on since December 2007, and it accelerated drastically starting in September 2008 following the bankruptcy of Lehman Brothers. By February 2010, the American economy was reported to be more shaky than the economy of Canada. Many service industries (particularly in countries that either have the same unemployment rate as the United States or greater) have reported dropping their prices in order to maximize profit margins (looking to make use of any price elasticity of demand in their market segments). This is an era in which employment is becoming unstable, and in which being either underemployed or unemployed is a common part of life for many people.

Net job gains and losses by month

United States

2008
September 2008 – 433,000 jobs lost
November 2008  – 803,000 jobs lost
December 2008  – 661,000 jobs lost

2009
January 2009   – 818,000 jobs lost
February 2009  – 724,000 jobs lost
March 2009     – 799,000 jobs lost
April 2009     – 692,000 jobs lost
May 2009       – 361,000 jobs lost
June 2009      – 482,000 jobs lost
July 2009      – 339,000 jobs lost
August 2009    – 222,000 jobs lost
September 2009 – 199,000 jobs lost
October 2009   – 202,000 jobs lost
November 2009 - 64,000 jobs created
December 2009 - 109,000 jobs lost

2010
January 2010  - 40,000 jobs lost
February 2010 - 35,000 jobs lost
March 2010    - 189,000 jobs created
April 2010 - 239,000 jobs created
May 2010 - 516,000 jobs created
June 2010 - 167,000 jobs lost
July 2010 - 58,000 jobs lost (143,000 Federal Census jobs lost) 
August 2010 - 51,000 jobs lost
September 2010 - 27,000 jobs lost (According to U.S. Labor Department, 64,000 private sector jobs are added but a net loss of 95,000 jobs are due to government layoffs) 
October 2010 - 220,000 jobs created (Private sector jobs net increase)
November 2010 - 121,000 jobs created
December 2010 - 120,000 jobs created

2011
January 2011 - 110,000 jobs created
February 2011 - 220,000 jobs created
March 2011 - 246,000 jobs created
April 2011 - 251,000 jobs created
May 2011 - 54,000 jobs created
June 2011 - 84,000 jobs created
July 2011 - 96,000 jobs created
August 2011 - 85,000 jobs created
September 2011 - 202,000 jobs created
October 2011 - 112,000 jobs created
November 2011 - 157,000 jobs created
December 2011 - 223,000 jobs created

2012
January 2012 - 275,000 jobs created
February 2012 - 259,000 jobs created
March 2012 - 143,000 jobs created
April 2012 - 68,000 jobs created
May 2012 - 87,000 jobs created
June 2012 - 45,000 jobs created
July 2012 - 181,000 jobs created
August 2012 - 142,000 jobs created
September 2012 - 114,000 jobs created
October 2012 - 225,000 jobs created 
November 2012 - 203,000 jobs created
December 2012 - 214,000 jobs created

Table

Preliminary

Note: Job losses in June and July 2010 are largely attributed to US census worker jobs lost. Private sector jobs have increased during those months.

Since the start of the recession, 8.8 million jobs have been lost, according to the Bureau of Labor Statistics.

In the U.S., jobs paying between $14 and $21 per hour made up about 60% those lost during the recession, but such mid-wage jobs have comprised only about 27% of jobs gained during the recovery through mid-2012. In contrast, lower-paying jobs constituted about 58% of the jobs regained.

Canada
Drastic job loss in Canada started later than in the US. 45 crores jobs has been lost in the USA itself in the time period. Some months in 2008 had job growth, such as September, while others such as July had losses. Due to the collapse of the American car industry at the same time as a strong Canadian dollar achieved parity +10% against a poorly-performing US dollar, the cross-border manufacturing industry has been disproportionately affected throughout.

September 2008 – No net loss
October 2008 – No net loss
November 2008 – 71,000 jobs lost
December 2008 – 34,000 jobs lost
January 2009 – 129,000 jobs lost
February 2009 – 82,600 jobs lost
March 2009 – 61,300 jobs lost
April 2009 – No net loss (1)
May 2009 – 36,000 jobs lost
October 2009 – 43,200 jobs lost
December 2009 - 28,300 jobs lost
January 2010 - 43,000 jobs created
February 2010 - 21,000 jobs created
March 2010 - 17,900 jobs created
April 2010 - 109,000 jobs created
May 2010 - 25,000 jobs created
June 2010 - 20,000 jobs created
September 2010 - 6,600 jobs lost
October 2010 - 47,000 jobs created
December 2010 - 22,000 jobs created

(1) 37,000 jobs are gained in the self-employment category

While job creation has increased in the past three months, most Canadians still complain about people getting laid off from work. However, a growing amount of these layoffs are considered for seasonal purposes and has little or no relation to the recession. Excluding Stelco employees, most laid off workers have six months to acquire a job while collecting unemployment insurance. After that, they must go on welfare and continue their job search from there.

May 2009 Canadian unemployment rate: 8.4%
September 2009 Canadian unemployment rate: 8.7%
November 2009 Canadian unemployment rate: 8.6%
January 2010 Canadian v rate: 8.3%
May 2010 Canadian unemployment rate: 8.1%
June 2010 Canadian unemployment rate: 8.1%
September 2010 Canadian unemployment rate: 8.0%
October 2010 Canadian unemployment rate: 7.9%
November 2010 Canadian unemployment rate: 7.6%

The employment rate has been stabilized between 8.0% and 11.0% for the past two years; signifying the economic strength of Canada's financial institutions compared to its counterparts in the United States. Many job places in Canada (i.e., grocery stores and restaurants) have opted to reduce hours rather than lay off staff. This unemployment of job protection is especially in industries that are needed to keep the economy from going into a depression. While the automotive sector is slowly recalling workers back to work, grocery stores and restaurants have slashed hours in the face of the global recession.

Australia
September 2008##– 2,200 jobs created
October 2008 – 34,300 jobs created
November 2008 – 15,600 jobs lost
December 2008 – 1,200 jobs lost
January 2009 – 1,200 jobs created
February 2009 – 1,800 jobs created
March 2009 – 34,700 jobs lost
April 2009 – 27,300 jobs created
May 2009 – 1,700 jobs lost
June 2009 – 21,400 jobs lost
July 2009 – 32,200 jobs created
August 2009 – 27,100 jobs lost
September 2009 – 40,600 jobs created
October 2009 – 24,500 jobs created

April 2009 Australian unemployment rate: 5.5%
July 2009 Australian unemployment rate: 5.8%
August 2009 Australian unemployment rate: 5.8%
September 2009 Australian unemployment rate: 5.7%
October 2009 Australian unemployment rate: 5.8%

The unemployment rate for October rose slightly due to population growth and other factors leading to 35,000 people looking for work, even though 24,500 jobs were created.

In general, throughout the subdued economic growth caused by the recession in the rest of the world, Australian employers have elected to cut working hours rather than fire employees, in recognition of the skill shortage caused by the resources boom.

United Kingdom
In September 2007, approximately a year before the recession began, unemployment stood at 1,649,000. By the end of 2008, that figure had risen to 1,860,000 - an increase of 211,000 and nearly 13%. By March 2009, unemployment had increased to more than 2,000,000 - the highest level the nation had seen for more than 12 years. It reached 2,261,000 by June that year, and by April 2010 had exceeded 2,500,000 for the first time in 16 years.

Confounding variables in determining cause and effect
The causality linking job losses to reduced business revenue is obviously grounded in reality, at least to a large extent. After all, it is self-evident that a firm with one million dollars in annual revenue cannot pay a two-million-dollar annual payroll without going into either debt or bankruptcy. However, at least some of the apparent or alleged causality is difficult to confirm quantitatively, because the data collection and analysis that would be required to do so faces high barriers to implementation, principally the privacy surrounding the accountancy. There is a common theme among working people, although it is not widely studied or reported in reliable academic or journalistic sources, along the lines that firms are "using the recession as an excuse" for staff reductions whose true root causes lie elsewhere, such as: 
 Productivity increases that would have happened anyway, recession or no (via ever-improving software and networks, for example, or via business process reengineering) 
 Offshoring disguised as layoffs in higher-wage countries happening "coincidentally" with hiring in lower-wage countries 
 Firing disguised as layoff (redundancy), where the motive for firing varies, including poor performance, low productivity, or even improper termination, but the employer benefits from not having to justify or document the job loss as a firing

This theme also extends to compensation reduction or growth freezes, with the suspicion again being that the recession is an excuse for, e.g., wage raise freezes, wage cuts, or increasing the employees' contribution percentage for (or lowering the benefits of) company health insurance, company retirement plans, and so on.

It is very difficult to accurately detect, verify, or track the data that would be needed to test these hypotheses. Short of any outright auditing (which has no legally justifiable basis), firms have a fair amount of plausible deniability. As for the concern that productivity growth drives unemployment, the very idea is controversial, and it depends on whatever the true reality may be in the relationship of automation to unemployment. Certainly a pattern of multiple jobless recoveries, where GDP grows while employment stagnates, makes the public wonder about firms' assurances that all layoffs are necessitated by business conditions alone.

References

2000s economic history
Great Recession